The Pruteț is a right tributary of the river Prut in Romania. It flows into the Prut in Bumbăta.

References

Rivers of Romania
Rivers of Vaslui County